The voiceless or more precisely tenuis (post)alveolar click is a click consonant found primarily among the languages of southern Africa.

Features
Features of the tenuis (post)alveolar click:

Occurrence
Tenuis alveolar clicks are found primarily in the various Khoisan language families of southern Africa and in some neighboring Bantu languages.

References

Click consonants
Oral consonants
Central consonants
Tenuis consonants